Avastrovirus is a genus of viruses, in the family Astroviridae. Birds serve as natural hosts. There are three species in this genus. Diseases associated with this genus include: gastroenteritis, liver or kidney damages.

Taxonomy
The genus contains the following species:
 Avastrovirus 1
 Avastrovirus 2
 Avastrovirus 3

Structure
Viruses in Avastrovirus are non-enveloped, with icosahedral and spherical geometries, and T=3 symmetry. The diameter is around 35 nm. Genomes are linear and non-segmented, around 6.8-7kb in length.

Life cycle
Viral replication is cytoplasmic. Entry into the host cell is achieved by attachment to host receptors, which mediates endocytosis. Replication follows the positive stranded RNA virus replication model. Positive stranded RNA virus transcription, using an unknown model of subgenomic RNA transcription is the method of transcription. Translation takes place by -1 ribosomal frameshifting. Birds serve as the natural host. Transmission routes are fecal-oral.

References

External links
 Viralzone: Avastrovirus
 ICTV

Astroviridae
Virus genera